Self-Portrait or Self-Portrait in a Black Cap is a c.1637 self-portrait by Rembrandt or portrait of the artist by his studio. It was bought as a self-portrait in 1848 by Richard Seymour-Conway and is now in the Wallace Collection in London. Until recently it was thought to be a workshop copy, but is now mostly accepted as by Rembrandt himself.

It is related to another portrait of Rembrandt now in the Museu de Arte de São Paulo, which is variously attributed to Rembrandt himself or to Govert Flinck.

Notes

References
Art UK page
Codart: "Rembrandt regained: new Rembrandts discovered at the Wallace Collection", on exhibition: 23 November 2006 - 25 February 2007 
Wallace Collection page

1637 paintings
Wallace, London
Paintings in the Wallace Collection